Mogila is a village in North Macedonia. The village is located in Pelagonia Region, north-east of the city of Bitola. The name probably derives from the Slavic word "Mogila" which could mean "mound", "hill" or "grave".

Demographics
According to the 2002 census, all but one of Mogila's 1,526 residents were Macedonian. Ethnic groups in the village include:

History
In the 19th century Ottoman Macedonia, Mogila was known as a village in the district of Bitola with a large population of "Komiti" or Macedonian freedom fighters. In 1900, Mogila had 850 residents.

In the late 19th century and early 20th century the village became involved in the struggle of the Internal Macedonian Revolutionary Organization against Ottoman rule. On May 8, 1903, the home of local revolutionary Nikola Meshkov, a member of Parashkev Tsvetkov's band, was raided by Ottoman forces, and in the ensuing battle three men and two women were killed.

Sports
Local football club FK Mogila last played in the Macedonian Third League.

Notable people
 Dimče Sarvanov, IMRO revolutionary

References

External links
 Municipality of Mogila 

Villages in Mogila Municipality